England House and Mill, also known as Red Mill Farm, is a historic home located at Newark, New Castle County, Delaware. The two-story brick dwelling was built in 1747. The oldest part of the house is believed to be the larger upper level; the smaller lower level having been added later for the miller.

It was added to the National Register of Historic Places in 1972.

References

External links

Houses on the National Register of Historic Places in Delaware
Houses completed in 1747
Houses in Newark, Delaware
Historic American Buildings Survey in Delaware
National Register of Historic Places in New Castle County, Delaware